Adam Webster may refer to:

 Adam Webster (footballer, born 1980), English footballer who played for Notts County
 Adam Webster (footballer, born 1995), English footballer who plays for Brighton & Hove Albion